The  were a group of dissolute writers who expressed the aimlessness and identity crisis of post-World War II Japan. While not comprising a true literary school, the Buraiha writers were linked together by a similar approach to the subject matter and literary style. The main characters in works of the Buraiha feature anti-heroes that are dissolute and aimless. Their work was based on criticism of the complete body of pre-war Japanese literature as well as American social values that were introduced into Japanese society with the occupation. Their work did not appeal to any one particular group, and their range was not well defined.

Writers
The term mainly applied to Ango Sakaguchi, Osamu Dazai and Sakunosuke Oda, however, it also often referred to others, such as Jun Ishikawa, Itō Sei, Jun Takami, Tanaka Hidemitsu and Kazuo Dan. Further, according to Takeo Okuno, the group also included Miyoshi Jūrō and Taiko Hirabayashi.

Lifestyle
Buraiha writers are sometimes referred to as the "decadents" in the west because of the decadent lifestyle they lead, spending time in bars, using narcotics, and having frequent sexual relationships. A prime example of this is Ango Sakaguchi, who shocked the Japanese public by his publication of an essay entitled . This, according to one critic, "allowed the Japanese people, especially the youth of Japan, to redeem its sense of self and begin life in the postwar period."

Term
The term "burai", which was bestowed on the group by conservative critics, literally meaning undependable, refers to someone whose behavior goes against traditional social conventions. Because of the subversive nature of their works, they were initially referred to as the  after an Edo-era literary movement, but the terms was replaced as less irreverent works became popular.

References

Further reading
Literary Mischief: Sakaguchi Ango, Culture, and the War, edited by James Dorsey and Doug Slaymaker, with translations by James Dorsey. Lanham, MA: Lexington Books, 2010. (Critical essays by Doug Slaymaker, James Dorsey, Robert Steen, Karatani Kojin, and Ogino Anna; translations of "Nihon bunka shikan" [A Personal View of Japanese Culture, 1942], "Shinju" [Pearls, 1942], "Darakuron" [Discourse on Decadence, 1946], and "Zoku darakuron" [Discourse on Decadence, Part II, 1946].)
Dorsey, James. “Culture, Nationalism, and Sakaguchi Ango,” Journal of Japanese Studies vol. 27, no. 2 (Summer 2001), pp. 347~379.
Dorsey, James. “Sakaguchi Ango,” in Modern Japanese Writers, ed. Jay Rubin (New York: Charles Scribner's Sons, 2000), pp. 31~48.

Buraiha